"Drop" is a song recorded by Canadian country music singer Dallas Smith. It was written by Joey Moi, Mark Holman, Michael Hardy, Steven Lee Olsen. The song was released to radio by 604 Records as the third single from his 2019 EP The Fall, and was later included on his 2020 album Timeless.

Chart performance
"Drop" reached a peak of Number One on the Billboard Canada Country chart dated September 7, 2019. It marks the singer's eighth Number One hit on the chart, the most by any Canadian country artist. It also peaked at number 77 on the Billboard Canadian Hot 100, his first single to chart there since "Autograph" in 2016.

Charts

Certifications

References

2019 songs
2019 singles
Dallas Smith songs
604 Records singles
Songs written by Joey Moi
Songs written by Steven Lee Olsen
Songs written by Hardy (singer)
Song recordings produced by Joey Moi